Ivor Joseph Dembina (born 14 April 1951) is a British stand-up comedian and writer in the alternative tradition from London.

Career
Dembina attributed his early "reputation for generally doing some decent gigs" to having "the brains to make sure there is a microphone facing the right way."

In 1987, together with club promoter, Addison Cresswell, he founded the Comedy Boom venue at the Edinburgh Festival Fringe in the basement of the Abercraig Lounge. It was the Edinburgh Festival Fringe's first venue that exclusively hosted stand-up comedy, and ran for five years.

After that, his career veered towards performance. He created and compèred a show called Comic Abuse at Pleasance Courtyard in the late 80s, which became a successful fixture and introduced acts such as Jo Brand and Jack Dee.

Dembina runs the Hampstead Comedy Club in North London, which he founded in 1994. He is cited as an early influence by Stewart Lee. He wrote for the first season of the Omid Djalili Show on BBC1. He appeared in the first season of Eye Spy as 'Jewish Dad' on Channel 4. He was the first stand-up comedian to perform a solo comedy show at the UK Houses of Parliament.

Dembina's comedy focuses on his Jewish background and his political outlook. He toured his show about the Israel-Palestine conflict, 'This is Not a Subject For Comedy', in Israel and on the West Bank. In 1998 he wrote and performed a show entitled SadoJudaism in which he talked about the worlds of fetishism and prostitution through Jewish eyes.

Stewart Lee credits him for correcting his microphone technique during a new act competition in 1990, calling him "the Obi-Wan Kenobi of comedy".

Political stance
Dembina has attracted attention for his anti-Zionist and socialist views.

In 2004, while on his way to perform stand-up comedy in Israel and the West Bank, Ivor was detained for several hours by Israeli police at Ben Gurion Airport after his name reportedly turned up on a list of "known radicals".

In 2008, Dembina organised a comedy event called "60 Years: What A State" on Israel's independence day, Yom Ha'atzmaut. Featuring Jeremy Hardy, Mark Steel, Reginald D Hunter and Shazia Mirza, it was on the same evening a gala event organised by the Zionist Federation at the Wembley Arena celebrated 60 years of the Israeli state. Ivor branded the gala's headliner, American comedian Jackie Mason, a "bad Jewish joke", citing Mason's support for Israel and the fact that comedian Ray Hanania, of Palestinian descent, had been dropped from supporting Mason on tour in 2002. Ivor said: "Never mind Israel not wanting to share Jerusalem with Palestinians, he won't even share a stage with one."

In 2011, Dembina threatened legal action and called for an investigation after a protester interrupted his Edinburgh Fringe preview show at a Jewish community centre in Golders Green, accusing him of performing a "tame version for a Jewish audience" and demanding that he reveal his anti-Israel views. Other activists picketed outside and handed out flyers. Ivor said afterwards: "In 25 years in Jewish comedy, during which I have performed both in Britain and abroad—including in Israel—this is the first time someone has attended a performance of mine with the apparent intention of sabotaging it."

In late 2013 and early 2014, Dembina joined other artists and writers including Nigel Kennedy, Yasmin Alibhai-Brown and Mark Steel at St James's Church, Piccadilly for Bethlehem Unwrapped, a festival during the Christmas season that drew attention to the Israeli West Bank barrier.

In 2014, Dembina caused consternation among sections of the Jewish community for organising a benefit show for the people of the Gaza Strip with Daniel Kitson, Josie Long and fellow Jewish comic Andy Zaltzman.

Also in 2014, he angered some other Jewish comedians by banning them from his club because they publicly endorsed and received payment from the Jewish National Fund.

In February 2015, he joined 700 other UK artists including Brian Eno, Mike Leigh and Liz Lochhead as a signatory to a cultural boycott of Israel.

In 2015, Dembina also attracted the interest of the political community for his willingness to use sensitive subjects such as the Holocaust, Israel and Jewish stereotypes in his material.

Dembina is a Labour Party member of the Vauxhall Constituency Labour Party.

Notable performances and tours

The Cochrane Theatre
In 1994 Ivor hosted a benefit for Jewish Socialist magazine at the Cochrane Theatre with Jo Brand, Jeremy Hardy, Linda Smith and Arnold Brown

Middle East
Ivor toured Israel and the West Bank with his show This is Not a Subject for Comedy in 2003.

UK Houses of Parliament
Ivor performed the first ever comedy gig at the UK Houses of Parliament in 2010.

Edinburgh shows
Ivor has performed at the Edinburgh Festival Fringe since 1991.

Written Works

An early work was the musical play A Week Is A Long Time In Politics about the 1981 Hillmarton By-election in Islington and performed at The Old Red Lion theatre pub there.

Ivor has contributed to many comedy books and been featured in several others.

Contributor

Comedy Clubs
Since 1985, Ivor has founded and run several comedy clubs. The Hampstead Comedy Club is the only one still operating.

 Founded the Red Rose Comedy Club in Finsbury Park, London in 1985.
 
 Founded the Comedy Boom with club promoter, Addison Cresswell in Edinburgh in 1987. The Edinburgh Festival Fringe's first venue for Stand-Up Comedy.
 
 Founded the Hampstead Comedy Club in 1994. It was originally held at the Washington Arms in Belsize Park, London. It currently resides at the Camden Head in Camden Town, London.
 
 Founded the Brixton Comedy Club in the Hobgoblin, Brixton, London in 1999.

Critical opinion
The Skinny magazine commented that there is something "modest and eternal" about him.

References

1951 births
Living people
English Jews
English male comedians
English stand-up comedians
English comedy writers
English socialists
Jewish male comedians
Edinburgh Festival Fringe
Labour Party (UK) people